Herpystis isolata is a species of moth of the family Tortricidae. It is found in Nigeria.

The wingspan is about 11 mm. The ground colour of the forewings is pale brownish grey, sprinkled with whitish and brown. The strigulation and lines from the dorsum are greyish brown, while the costal strigulae are brownish cream. The dorsal area is paler than the remaining ground colour, with a diffuse brown tornal blotch. The markings are brown, forming indistinct postbasal fascia from the dorsum towards the costa. The hindwings are brownish, but pale basally and darker at the apex.

Etymology
The species name refers to the systematic position in the genus and is derived from Latin isolata (meaning isolated).

References

Moths described in 2013
Eucosmini